Westside Football Club is a football club based in Wandsworth, Greater London, England.

History
The club was established in May 1996 as a Christian club representing West Side Church in Wandsworth. They later joined the Surrey South Eastern Combination. In 2014–15 the club were Division Two champions, earning promotion to Division One. The following season saw them win the Division One title and were promoted to the Surrey Elite Intermediate League. In 2018–19 the club applied for promotion to Division One of the Combined Counties League, with a fourth-place finish being enough for the club to move up to Division One of the Combined Counties League. At the end of the 2020–21 season they were transferred to Division One of the Southern Counties East League.

Honours
Surrey South Eastern Combination
Division One champions 2015–16
Division Two champions 2014–15

Records
Best FA Cup performance: Preliminary round, 2020–21
Best FA Vase performance: First round, 2019–20

Longest Serving Players
Alex Dowdeswell, 24 Years, debut August 1996

References

Football clubs in England
Football clubs in London
Association football clubs established in 1996
1996 establishments in England
Surrey South Eastern Combination
Surrey Elite Intermediate Football League
Combined Counties Football League
Southern Counties East Football League